Chocolate Soldier is an expression referring to a good-looking but useless warrior, popularised by George Bernard Shaw's 1894 play Arms and the Man. The term originates as a derogatory label for a soldier who would not fight but would look good in a uniform, shortened from 'Chocolate Cream Soldier'. It appears in that form in the 1897 book Soldier of Fortune by Richard Harding Davis.

It can refer to: 

 The Chocolate Soldier, a 1908 operetta by Oscar Straus, based on the play Arms and the Man
 The Chocolate Soldier, a missionary recruitment pamphlet written by Charles Studd in 1912 
 The Chocolate Soldier (film), a 1941 film version of the operetta, starring Nelson Eddy
 A cocktail, whose name is indirectly derived from the above - see List of cocktails
 Chocolate Soldier (drink), a chocolate-flavored soft drink originally made by Monarch Beverage Company of Atlanta in the 1960s
 A member of the Australian Army Reserve past or present; called 'Choco' for short. Usually a derogatory term. Also used derisively to refer to 'soft' soldiers in the Israeli Army.
 Chocolate Soldier (Parliament), a Parliamentary assistant for an Opposition front-bench spokesman in the British House of Commons in the early 1970s, funded by the Joseph Rowntree Reform Trust
 A member of the army of Chocolate Soldiers in The Wonder City of Oz (1940)
Hot Chocolate Soldiers a 1934 Walt Disney cartoon
 One of the common names of Kalanchoe tomentosa, a succulent plant
 Two brush-footed butterflies:
 Junonia iphita, also called the chocolate pansy
 Junonia hedonia, also called the brown pansy